The  Adamawa State House of Assembly is the legislative arm of the government  of Adamawa State of Nigeria. It is a unicameral legislature with 25 members elected from the 21 local government areas (State Constituencies). Local government areas with considerable larger population are delineated into two constituencies to give equal representation. This makes the number of legislators in the Adamawa State House of Assembly 25.

The fundamental functions of the Assembly are to enact new laws, amend or repeal existing laws and oversight of the executive. Members of the assembly are elected for a term of four years concurrent with federal legislators (Senate and House of Representatives). The state assembly convenes three times a week (Tuesdays, Wednesdays and Thursdays) in the assembly complex within the state capital, Yola.

The current speaker of the 7th Adamawa State House of Assembly is Iya Abbas. People's Democratic Party (PDP) is the majority party with 13 members while All Progressives Congress has 11 seats African Democratic Congress has 1 putting them in the minority position.

References 

Politics of Adamawa State
Government of Nigeria